Harry Combes (March 3, 1915 – November 13, 1977), a native of Monticello, Illinois, served as head men's basketball coach at University of Illinois between 1947 and 1967.

Biography
Combes played high school basketball for Monticello High School, where he led his teams to an overall combined record of 72–9.

A three-year letterwinner, Combes was also a star player for the Illini from 1935 to 1937 and helped lead Illinois to both its Big Ten titles in the 1930s.

Combes began coaching basketball at Champaign High School, where he posted an astounding 254–46 record, including winning the state title in 1946. Beyond the single championship, Combes led Champaign Central to seven state tournament appearances in nine years from 1939 to 1947.  During that time the Maroons captured fourth place in 1940 and 1944 before starting three years of amazing runs to the championship game where they finished second in 1945, first in 1946, and second in 1947. In 2007, the Illinois High School Association named Combes one of the 100 Legends of the IHSA Boys Basketball Tournament.

Combes also served as boys baseball coach at Champaign High School, where he compiled an impressive 70–26–2 (.724) record over a five-year period (1937–1942).

Once at Illinois he won three Big Ten titles in his first five seasons (1949, 1951, and 1952).  Combes led Illinois to three third-place finishes in the NCAA tournament in the four-year period from 1949 to 1952.  The squad won 79 of the 100 games during those four years.  Illinois' 1952 Final Four appearance was the first officially recognized Final Four, and the three third-place finishes would be the Illini's deepest runs in the tournament until the 1989 team made the Final Four. Until Lou Henson broke the record in 1990, Combes' 316 wins were the most wins ever by an Illinois head basketball coach.

Combes, along with his assistant coach Howie Braun and head football coach Pete Elliott, were pressured into resigning on March 19, 1967 by the university which was threatened with expulsion by the Big Ten Conference over a slush fund scandal. He was succeeded by Harv Schmidt ten days later on March 29.

He died in Champaign on November 13, 1977.

Head coaching record

High school

College

See also
 List of NCAA Division I Men's Final Four appearances by coach

References

1915 births
1977 deaths
All-American college men's basketball players
Basketball coaches from Illinois
Basketball players from Illinois
High school basketball coaches in Illinois
Illinois Fighting Illini men's basketball coaches
Illinois Fighting Illini men's basketball players
People from Monticello, Illinois
American men's basketball players